Lucie Granier (born 11 June 1999) is a French handball player who plays for ESBF Besançon and the French national team.

References

External links

1999 births
Living people
French female handball players